Gangota is a community from Bihar. Most are cultivators or landless agricultural labourers, while some few hold lands. Their name is said to be derived from the Ganges, near where many of the community have settled. The community is now listed as an OBC caste at the Centre and an EBC caste in Bihar. In Old Purnia district, a large number of Gangota community members were Bataidars, or subtenants. Many, due to their residence by riverbanks, are marginal fishermen who have faced significant oppression from private fishery owners and later fish mafias who extort fishermen out of catches.

In the late 19th century, the Gangotas had two sub-castes: Gangaji and Jahnavi. A man could not marry a woman of the same section or with descent from that section up to four generations back. Widowers can marry their late wife's younger sisters. Although in the late 19th century most claimed to practice infant marriage, adult marriage was similarly common. Sindoordan, or the giving of sindoor, was the binding portion of the marriage ceremony. Widows could remarry but were expected to marry their late husband's younger brother. There was no recognized divorce.

They worship Jagdamba with husked rice and incense once or twice a month. On weddings, sickness or other significant occasions, Bhagwati is propitiated with goats, rice, ghee, tulsi leaves and sindoor.

Their social status was similar to those of similar communities like the Koeri and Kurmi.

Distribution
Gangotas are distributed largely in the 5,656 sq km stretch of Bhagalpur district of Bihar. The area they inhabited were flood prone, and every year after the flood water receded the river banks (Diara), the upper-caste landlords  mobilized their private armies to capture the deserted land and prevent the Gangotas from acquiring their erstwhile homes. The unscrupulous activity of the upper castes forced many of them to join the underground activities like banditry and other organised crime leading to serious law and order problems in the district.

References 

Social groups of Bihar